Bhanu Lal Saha is a member of 12th Tripura Legislative Assembly and was also a member of 5th, 10th and 11th Assembly and Former Finance Minister of Tripura. He belongs to Communist Party of India (Marxist) and represents Bishalgarh constituency.

References

Living people
Tripura politicians
Bengali people
Tripura MLAs 2018–2023
Year of birth missing (living people)
Tripura MLAs 2008–2013
Tripura MLAs 2013–2018
Tripura MLAs 1983–1988